Wilhelma-Theater is a theatre in Stuttgart, Baden-Württemberg, Germany.

Theatres in Stuttgart